TV3 Sport 2 is a Danish TV channel dedicated to sports which was launched on February 5, 2013. The channel is owned by Modern Times Group and is a sister channel of TV3 Sport 1. TV3 Sport 2 broadcasts the Danish Superliga and UEFA Champions League in football as well as darts, athletics, golf, speedway and many other sports.

History
On August 23, 2017, Viasat Danmark and Modern Times Group announced that TV3 Sport 2 closes on 31 October 2017 in favour of a broader men’s channel called TV3 MAX. All sports programming broadcast on TV3 Sport 2 will be taken over by TV3 MAX, which will also show series like Top Gear, The Simpsons and How I Met Your Mother. Viewers who have access to TV3 Sport 2 will automatically access TV3 MAX.

References

External links
 

Television stations in Denmark
Television channels and stations established in 2013
Television channels and stations disestablished in 2017
2013 establishments in Denmark
2017 disestablishments in Denmark
Sports television in Denmark
Modern Times Group